Thorius insperatus is a species of salamander in the family Plethodontidae. It is endemic to Sierra Juárez, Oaxaca, Mexico. The holotype was collected near Vista Hermosa, at  asl. The specimen was collected under a log in forest. A second specimen was collected in 1998. The species is threatened by habitat loss caused by logging and expanding agriculture.

References

Thorius
Endemic amphibians of Mexico
Fauna of the Sierra Madre de Oaxaca
Taxonomy articles created by Polbot
Amphibians described in 1994